The Fulda–Hanau railway is a double track and electrified main line in the German state of Hesse. It runs south from Fulda along a ridge and then through the valley of the Kinzig to Hanau. As a result, it is also known as the Kinzig Valley Railway.

The line was completed in 1868, as part of the Frankfurt–Bebra railway. It has been upgraded for high-speed traffic as part of an important line between Frankfurt and northern and eastern Germany.

History 

The construction of the Kinzig Valley Railway commenced as part of the Bebra–Hanau railway or Kurhessen State railway. After the Prussian annexation of the Electorate of Hesse-Kassel (Kurhessen) as a result of the Austro-Prussian War of 1866, it was completed to Frankfurt as the Frankfurt-Bebra railway in 1868.

As a result of the division of Germany after World War II, the traditional traffic flows from Frankfurt to Leipzig and Berlin on the Kinzig Valley Railway were largely lost. Increasingly, however, traffic to and from Hamburg shifted from the Main–Weser Railway to the Kinzig Valley Railway.

The route of the current connection of the new line south of Fulda to the Kinzig Valley Railway was determined during the course of discussions of various options for the route of the planned Hanover–Würzburg high-speed railway in the Fulda area in the first half of the 1970s. There is a grade separated junction with the track from Kassel to Frankfurt passing under the high speed tracks between Fulda and Würzburg.

Traffic 
Around 300 trains operate each day on the section between Gelnhausen and Hanau. In 2006, about 175 trains ran each day between Flieden and Fulda each way. 23 percent of this traffic was attributable to long-distance passenger services, 18 percent to local passenger services and 59 percent to freight transport.

Infrastructure 
A 16 km section near Hanau (km 24.8 to 40.3) is equipped with the Linienzugbeeinflussung cab signalling and train protection system, constructed with three tracks and operated at speed of up to 200 km/h.

Long-distance passenger services 
Today the stretch is part of the Intercity-Express (ICE) line from northern and eastern Germany to south western Germany via Frankfurt. The ICE trains are mainly operated with ICE 1 and ICE T sets. Intercity services are usually hauled by a class 101 locomotive (and sometimes a class 120 locomotive) and have a control car.

Regional services 
The most important services on the line are the Regional-Express services from Fulda and the Regionalbahn services from Wächtersbach to Frankfurt. Most Regionalbahn and Regional-Express trains consist (in 2022) of a class 146.2 locomotive or one of nine Siemens Vectron locomotives with 6 double-deck carriages. The first and last carriages are carriages with spaces for bicycles.
  
In December 2025 the locomotives and the double-deck carriages will be replaced by newly produced Alstom Coradia Stream HC trains with free-wifi (gratis).

Freight 
Along with the Main-Weser Railway it is one of the major freight lines in central Germany running north–south. Significant freight traffic operates on it from nearly every major German freight centre and from neighboring countries. Freight trains operated by private railway companies are also often seen on the line.

Development 
It is undisputed that the line is overloaded and in need of further development. Although this has been under discussion for decades, no decision has been taken on the form or timing of an upgrade.

Line 
Already in the Federal Transport Infrastructure Plan (Bundesverkehrswegeplan) of 1973, the Flieden–Frankfurt section was one of eight planned rail corridors for upgrading. Although it was not included for development in the Federal Transport Infrastructure Plan of 1980, it was again included in the Federal Transport Infrastructure Plan of 1985.

Because of the high utilisation of the mostly double-track line with long-distance, regional and freight traffic, it was planned to establish in the long term a continuous high-speed line with speeds of over 160 km/h between Hanau and Fulda so that fast intercity trains were not slowed by other traffic and the sharp curves in the Kinzig Valley. The development of the track was included in 1983 as one of the most urgent needs in the Federal Transport Infrastructure Plan. The traffic forecast for the Federal Transport Infrastructure Plan of 1992 forecast that an upgraded line would carry 36 passenger trains and 104 freight trains per day in each direction in 2010.

Construction began in 1987. The most important project was the construction of the Schlüchtern Tunnel. The second tube was originally supposed to be completed in time for the full commissioning of the Hanover–Würzburg and the Mannheim–Stuttgart high-speed lines in 1991. There were delays due to delays in the project approval process, especially in relation to the elimination of level crossings. In early 1991, four of the 25 sections of the project were completed, 13 were under construction, five were still in the planning approval process and three were at the planning stage.

Planning at the end of 1988 foresaw the Wolfgang–Gelnhausen section would be upgraded to three tracks for 200 km/h by 1991. The Neuhof–Fulda section was expected to follow by 1994. The official start of the upgrade was the symbolic driving of first pile by the then Hessen Minister of Economics, Dieter Posch, on 27 September 1989 in Steinau. Under the plans of 1989, DM 610 million would be invested over six years, including DM 150 million for the elimination of level crossings. By then a roughly 37 kilometre section would permit speeds of 200 km / h.

To accommodate the scheduled start of ICE operation, the high-speed section (200 km/h) between Hailer-Meerholz and Hanau-Wolfgang was put into operation on 2 June 1991. The Bronzell–Flieden, the Ahl–Wächtersbach and the Wirtheim–Niedermittlau sections have since been scheduled to operate at up to 160 km / h. On 22 May 1993, the 19 km long third track between Hanau and Gelnhausen-Hailer was put in operation. It is, like the parallel tracks on this section, largely designed for 200 km/h. A total of DM 230 million were invested in connection with the upgrade to three tracks over four-year and the upgrading of existing tracks for 200 km/h; about DM 150 million of this was for the third track. During the four years of construction, a total of approximately 200,000 m³ of soil was removed and stored temporarily.

With the ability to overtake moving local trains prolonged delays at stations could be avoided. As a result of the commissioning of the section, the travel time on the 55-km-long route between Wächtersbach and Frankfurt fell by up to 18 minutes and the number of weekday regional trains on it increased from 87 to 91. Further upgrading is planned but had to be stopped in 2004 due to lack of federal funding.

Firstly, the third track is to be extended from Hailer-Meerholz station to Gelnhausen. An upgrade of this section to four tracks is being kept open as an option.

In 2007, DB Netz started building a second tube of the new Schlüchtern Tunnel through the Distelrasen ridge and the entire project was completed on 25 April 2011. The old tunnel went into operation again as a single-track in June 2014. Since there has been one track for each direction of travel. The permissible speed on this section was increased from 110 to 140 to 160 km/h during the refurbishment.

The line was rebuilt next to the Neuhof–Eichenzell section of the A 66 in Neuhof. Here, the design speed in the station area was increased from 130 to 160 km/h. This was forecast in 2006 to cost €56 million. This work was completed for the timetable change in December 2011.

In December 2015, a bridge was opened over the line in Niedermittlau, replacing a level crossing.

Mottgers link
A new link, known as Mottgers-Spange ("Mottgers link") has been under discussion for many years
from Gelnhausen to Mottgers on the Hanover–Würzburg high-speed line, connecting to Fulda with a spur to the Nantenbach Curve, connecting to Würzburg. The higher speeds would allow travel times from Frankfurt to Fulda and to Würzburg to be reduced by about ten minutes each. This would also allow the little used southern section of the Hanover–Würzburg high-speed line to be more used. This project, however, is currently neither affordable nor politically feasible. However, further development of the existing route is being studied.

Notes

References

External links 
 

Railway lines in Hesse
Railway lines opened in 1868
1868 establishments in Prussia
Buildings and structures in Fulda (district)
Buildings and structures in Main-Kinzig-Kreis